The New Zealand Olympic Museum, was situated on Queens Wharf, Wellington, New Zealand. It was established on 23 June 1998 and closed in January 2013 after the New Zealand Olympic Committee (NZOC) relocated to Auckland. The museum's collection focuses on New Zealand's involvement in the Olympic movement and promoting Olympic values. The NZOC intends to reintroduce the museum's collection through digital activity and outreach programmes to other museums.

Collection
The museum had the Lonsdale Cup (NZOC) on permanent display, as well as the Te Mahutonga Cloak when it was not attending the games.

Te Kohatu Mauri Stone
On Olympic Day 23 June 2004, Te Runanga O Ngai Tahu presented two greenstone taonga to the New Zealand Olympic Committee a pendant that would travel with the Te Mahutonga Cloak and a Maori touchstone that would travel with the New Zealand Olympic Team to all future games. The Te Kohatu Mauri Stone is a pounamu touchstone that works on the principle that each person who views or touches it passes on their life-force (mauri), imparting their energy towards the competing athletes.

See also
 New Zealand at the Olympics
 New Zealand Olympic medallists

References

External links 
New Zealand Olympic Museum 
Featured New Zealand Olympic Museum Collection 

Museums in Wellington City
Defunct museums
New Zealand at the Olympics
Museums established in 1998
1998 establishments in New Zealand
Museums disestablished in 2013
2013 disestablishments in New Zealand
Sports museums in New Zealand
Olympic museums